U.S. Highway 20 (US 20) is a part of the United States Numbered Highway System that runs for  from Newport, Oregon to Boston, Massachusetts. Within the State of Nebraska it is a state highway that begins on the Wyoming–Nebraska state line west of Harrison near the Niobrara River and runs to the Nebraska–Iowa state line in South Sioux City. Throughout its  length the route passes through a diverse range of landscapes including bluffs and escarpments in the Northwest Panhandle, the Nebraska Sandhills in the northern part of the state, and rolling hills and plains as the highway approaches the Missouri River valley south of Sioux City, Iowa. Throughout its length, US 20 is a two-lane highway with the exception of the easternmost  which is four-lane divided highway, the last  of which is concurrent with Interstate 129. The  between the Wyoming border and Valentine is designated as the Bridges to Buttes Byway, one of nine scenic byways in the state of Nebraska.

Route description

Bridges to Buttes Scenic Byway
The Nebraska Department of Roads has designated nine stretches of state highway as scenic byways throughout the state. These are typically two-lane highways traveling through diverse terrain and passing by historical markers and attractions that put the rich history of Nebraska's past on display. Along US 20 the route between the Wyoming state line and Valentine, a  stretch, is designated the Bridges to Buttes Scenic Byway. Along this route, the highway passes through diverse landscapes such as escarpments and the Nebraska Sandhills as well as historical points of interest including Fort Robinson.

Wyoming state line to Rushville
US 20 enters Nebraska along the Wyoming state line east of Van Tassell just north of the Niobrara River passing through gently rolling plains with intermittent rock outcroppings on the way to Harrison. Harrison, the state's northwesternmost town, is home to the Sioux County Historical Museum.  Just a few miles northeast of town lies Sowbelly Canyon, a part of the Pine Ridge escarpment. The highway then continues into the eastern reaches of Sioux County which are marked by high plains, bluffs and escarpments including the Red Cloud Buttes as the road passes through Fort Robinson State Park. The park is home to Fort Robinson, a former U.S. Army fort instrumental during the Sioux Wars between 1876 and 1890 and where Crazy Horse surrendered in 1877. From there the highway continues to the northeast where it enters Crawford. Here the highway runs to the north concurrently with N-2 and N-71 along the east side of town for a mile before turning to the northeast, traveling through rolling plains passing south of Whitney Lake before meeting up with US 385 west of Chadron. US 20 runs concurrently with US 385 to the west side of town where 385 departs to the south while US 20 continues east through Chadron.

It is also home to the Pine Ridge Ranger District of the Nebraska National Forest. The Museum of Fur Trade is also located in Chadron at the site of a former fur trading post run by the American Fur Company between 1837 and 1876. The highway leaves Chadron and runs southeast alongside the Little Bordeaux Creek. As the road continues towards Hay Springs it makes a  climb as it passes through a portion of the Pine Ridge Escarpment. To the north, the Beaver Wall escarpment provides views of the surroundings including the buttes at Crawford all the way to the Black Hills. In Hay Springs, US 20 meets up with N-87, which joins from the south. On the west side of Rushville, Highway 87 leaves to the north towards Pine Ridge, South Dakota while US 20 continues through town.

Rushville to Valentine

After departing Rushville, US 20 bends to the northeast passing agricultural fields and grasslands. The highway passes through the small village of Clinton and continues on to the northeast before reaching the city of Gordon. Gordon was home to outlaw Doc Middleton who operated a saloon in town between 1900 and 1913. The road winds its way to the northeast before arriving at the village of Merriman in Cherry County. Cherry County is the largest county, by land area, in Nebraska with over  it is larger than the states of Connecticut, Delaware, and Rhode Island combined. Here, US 20 intersects N-61 which is one of the most desolate highways in the state. Traveling south it is almost  to the next town, Hyannis. From Merriman, US 20 continues east through the northern reaches of the sandhills. Between Merriman and Crookston, the highway is within  of the South Dakota border.

Continuing through the sandhills, the highway winds its way east until it enters the small village of Cody. Cody was named for a railroad foreman and not Buffalo Bill. The highway continues on to the east through the small villages of Nenzel, Kilgore, and Crookston. Here the highway crosses over the Minnechaduza Creek marking the northern extent of the Nebraska Sandhills. The route then turns southeast, running parallel to the Minnechaduza Creek along the edge of the sandhills towards the city of Valentine. US 20 meets up with several other highways in Valentine, US 83, N-12, and N-97 serving as a crossroads of North Central Nebraska. The Niobrara River runs along the southeast side of Valentine and the portion east of town is the start of the Niobrara Valley Preserve, which preserves thousands of acres or riverine canyons and grasslands along a  stretch of the river. This portion of the river is also designated as a National Scenic River. Valentine marks the eastern terminus of the Bridges to Buttes Scenic Byway.

Valentine to O'Neill
From Valentine, US 20 takes a southeast line crossing the Niobrara River back into the sandhills. It continues towards the southeast through the small villages of Wood Lake and Johnstown before turning to the east. After leaving Johnstown, the road enters flat plains where agricultural fields utilizing center pivot irrigation dot the landscape as the highway heads east towards Ainsworth. In Ainsworth, the road meets up with N-7 and runs concurrently for  before US 183 also joins from the south. The three highways continue east and cross over a canyon formed by Long Pine Creek just north of Long Pine.  later, the three highways diverge in Bassett. Highway 7 continues north towards Springview while US 183 heads south to Taylor. US 20 continues east through the small villages of Newport and Stuart before turning southeast and entering the city of Atkinson. From here the highway continues east along the southern edge of flat plains dotted with agricultural fields into the city of O'Neill. O'Neill is located in the Elkhorn Valley and lies just north of the river of the same name.

O'Neill to Iowa
US 20 leaves O'Neill headed southeast concurrently with US 275 for  before turning due east towards the village of Orchard. The highway continues east beyond Orchars and past the small villages of Royal, Brunswick, and Plainview. As US 20 continues east towards Osmond there is a marked change in terrain as the road transitions from the flat plains to rolling hills of eastern Nebraska on the way to the Missouri River. From Osmond, the highway continues east before crossing US 81 then turns northeast and travels along with Middle Logan Creek through the communities of Randolph and Belden. The highway takes a jog to the north at Laurel for  before turning back to the east. After passing by the towns of Waterbury, Willis, and Jackson, US 20 emerges from the rolling hills into the Missouri River plain. As it approaches South Sioux City the highway becomes a four-lane divided highway for the first time along its entire length. Shortly, thereafter, the highway becomes expressway and runs concurrently with Interstate 129 as it intersects US 75 and US 77. The highway continues east to the Missouri River where it crosses into Iowa functioning as a bypass around the southeastern side of Sioux City, Iowa.

History

Prior to the assignment of US 20, this route across northern Nebraska carried several different route numbers. In 1922, the highway followed the routes of N-79, N-78, N-77, N-65, and N-49 from west to east between the Wyoming state line and South Sioux City. This route generally followed the former Cowboy Line, part of the Chicago and North Western Railway, from Wyoming to Sioux City via O'Neill. This is now a partially abandoned railway that has been converted into a biking and hiking trail. In the mid-1920s the multiple state highway designations gave way to a single route number, N-1 which encompassed the entire route from Wyoming to Iowa and was the immediate predecessor to US 20 in 1926.

There have been a few realignments of US 20 since its designation in 1926. This alignment went due east from Laurel, along present day 869th Road, passing Dixon and Allen to an intersection with present-day N-9 where it turned north to meet up with the current alignment. West of Fort Robinson, an old alignment of US 20 traveled along modern day Smiley Canyon Scenic Drive. This is a winding road that runs through Smiley Canyon north of the current alignment. During the winters, this area of US 20 would become treacherous leading to many accidents.

In November, 2010, Nebraska Governor Dave Heineman approved designating US-20 from Hay Springs to Fort Robinson in honor of Crazy Horse, capping a year-long effort by citizens of Chadron. The designation may extend east another 100 miles through Cherry County to Valentine.  The following year, on June 5, the highway was officially dedicated during a ceremony at Fort Robinson State Park.

Major intersections

References

External links

 Nebraska Roads: US 6-38

 Nebraska
20
Transportation in Sioux County, Nebraska
Transportation in Dawes County, Nebraska
Transportation in Sheridan County, Nebraska
Transportation in Cherry County, Nebraska
Transportation in Brown County, Nebraska
Transportation in Rock County, Nebraska
Transportation in Holt County, Nebraska
Transportation in Antelope County, Nebraska
Transportation in Pierce County, Nebraska
Transportation in Cedar County, Nebraska
Transportation in Dixon County, Nebraska
Transportation in Dakota County, Nebraska